Rivash (also Romanized as Rīvash; also known as Rivūsh and Raush) is a city in Kuhsorkh County, Razavi Khorasan Province, Iran. At the 2006 census, its population was 4,610, in 1,277 families.

History 
According to the evidence, this area was inhabited before the advent of Islam, and due to the fact that the old road of the southern cities of Razavi Khorasan to Tehran passed through this area, it has been more prosperous in the past. One of the most important historical events is the Mongol invasion, which after the occupation of Nishapur, due to its impassability and the large number of snakes in the area, Mongol horses and soldiers could not pass through this area and escaped its bite.

Climate 
The climate of Rivash, is temperate and due to its lush nature, vegetation, dense trees, river, south and west of the city, it has a cool climate in summers and very cold winters. The average annual temperature is 25 degrees.

Historical sites, ancient artifacts and tourism

Shahi Dam 

Shahi Dam was built  about 700 to 1000 years ago and  located in Kariz, Kuhsorkh County.

Band-e Qara Bathhouse 
Band-e Qara Bathhouse is a historical Public bathing related to the Qajar dynasty and is located in Band-e Qara, Razavi Khorasan Province.

Band-e Qara Glacier 

Band-e Qara Glacier is a Glacier is located in Band-e Qara, Razavi Khorasan Province.

Baghdasht Peak 
Baghdasht mountain range, the largest peak of which is 2500 meters above sea level, is part of the Rivash heights and is located near the village of Kariz, 25 km northwest of Kashmar.

Qal'eh Dokhtar, Kuhsorkh 
Qal'eh Dokhtar is a historical castle located in Kuhsorkh County in Razavi Khorasan Province, The longevity of this fortress dates back to the Nizari Ismaili state.

Gabar Hesar Castle 
Gabar Hesar Castle is a Castle related to the second century AH and is located in the Kuhsorkh County.

Nameq Village 

Nameq is located in a hilly area and many mountains surround the village. In addition, there are the remains of an ancient castle, pre-Islamic and post-Islamic cemeteries, a citadel, mosques and other beautiful pieces of architecture.

Nameq Cemetery 
The Nameq Cemetery is a historical cemetery related to the Safavid dynasty and is located in Nameq.

Nameq Castle 
Nameq Castle is a historical castle located in Nameq in Razavi Khorasan Province, The longevity of this fortress dates back to the Before the Mongol conquest.

References 

Kuhsorkh County
Populated places in Kuhsorkh County
Cities in Razavi Khorasan Province